Horodnianka may refer to the following places:
Horodnianka, Gmina Czarna Białostocka in Podlaskie Voivodeship (north-east Poland)
Horodnianka, Gmina Wasilków in Podlaskie Voivodeship (north-east Poland)
Horodnianka, Sokółka County in Podlaskie Voivodeship (north-east Poland)